Pelargonium line pattern virus (PLPV) is a plant pathogenic virus of the family Tombusviridae.

External links
 ICTVdB - The Universal Virus Database: Pelargonium line pattern virus
 Family Groups - The Baltimore Method

Viral plant pathogens and diseases
Tombusviridae